Pride Canterbury is the LGBTQ+ pride event and parade held each June in Canterbury, Kent in the United Kingdom, since 2016. Due to the COVID-19 pandemic its fifth annual event planned for 13 June 2020 was rescheduled to 11 September 2021. Returning on Sat 10th and Sun 11th June 2023.

Canterbury's Pride Exhibition 
The Canterbury's Pride Exhibition, held at the Beaney House of Art and Knowledge, ran from Saturday 8 August 2020 to Wednesday 9 September 2020. This exhibition showcased the history of Pride Canterbury through exhibits, photographs and film, in addition to information about the Stonewall riots, the origin of Pride parades, and the history of drag.

History

2016–2021 
First launched on 11 June 2016, Pride Canterbury saw over 2,000 people attend. This increased when the second event took place in June 2017. On 9 June 2018 over 16,000 people attend.

From 2016 to 2019, the parade started at The Marlowe Theatre, led by the Lord Mayor of Canterbury and proceeded through the high street up to the Dane John Gardens for the Pride festival.

Events have included speeches from Rosie Duffield in 2017; acts included S Club, and The Vixen both in 2018, RuPaul’s Drag Race queens Courtney Act and Willam In 2017.

In 2019 over 20,000 people attended on 15 June 2019. Acts included among others Gok Wan and Nadine Coyle.

Pride Canterbury on 11 September 2021 featured artists such as Baga Chipz, 5ive, Cheryl Hole, The Saturgays, etc.

2022 
Pride Canterbury 2022 has been confirmed for 11 June 2022, featuring Denise Van Outen, Alexandra Burke, and stars from RuPaul's Drag Race.

2023

Lineups

References 

Pride parades in England
Summer events in England
LGBT organisations in England